Andriy Semenov (born 4 July 1984 in Orhei) is a Ukrainian shot putter.

Semenov was born in Moldavian SSR; he does his trainings in Odessa. He finished fourth at the 2001 World Youth Championships. He competed at the 2008 Olympic Games, and with a throw of 20.01 metres he was only 1 centimetre short of a place in the final, among the top twelve. Semenov also competed at the 2012 Olympic Games.

His personal best throw is 20.63 metres, achieved in August 2011 in Donetsk.

In August 2019, Semenov received a 2 year doping ban after a re-testing case from the 2011 World Championships. All of his results from 22 August 2011 to 21 August 2013 were disqualified.

Competition record

References

Ukrainian male shot putters
Athletes (track and field) at the 2008 Summer Olympics
Athletes (track and field) at the 2012 Summer Olympics
Olympic athletes of Ukraine
1984 births
Living people
People from Orhei
Ukrainian people of Moldovan descent